A jet set is an international social group of wealthy people.

Jet set or Jetset may also refer to:

Music

Artists

 The Jet Set, a Polish musical group
 The Jetset, a British band (1979–1988)

Record labels

 Jet Set Records, a French record label
 Jetset Records, a New York-based indie rock record label

Songs
 "Jet Set" (song), a song by Alphaville
 "Jet Set", an instrumental song composed by Mike Vickers
 "The Jet Set", a song from Joe Jackson's album Big World
 "(We're Not) The Jet Set", a song by George Jones and Tammy Wynette
"Jet Set", a song by AVA

Television
 Jet Set (game show), a game show in the United Kingdom, which is also in conjunction with the National Lottery
 "Jet Set", Mad Men (season 2), episode 11
 The Jet Set (TV program)

Other media 
 Jet Set (film), 2000 French film
 Jet-Set (magazine), Colombian magazine
Jetset Magazine, American magazine
JetSetCam, Adult cam
 JETSET, former name of the podcast Epic Fu
 Jet Set, a recurring character on the Comedy Central series Workaholics
 Jet Set Radio, a 2000 action video game
 Jet Set Willy, a 1984 platform video game

Sports
 Jet Setting, an Irish Thoroughbred racehorse

Other uses
 JETSET, the callsign for First Choice Airways